Gorgyra sara, the common leaf sitter, is a butterfly in the family Hesperiidae. It is found in Sierra Leone, Liberia, Ivory Coast, Ghana, Nigeria, Cameroon, Equatorial Guinea (Mbini), the Republic of the Congo, the Central African Republic and the Democratic Republic of the Congo. The habitat consists of forests.

The larvae feed on Cnestis ferruginea.

References

Butterflies described in 1937
Erionotini